Satondella tabulata is a species of minute sea snail, a marine gastropod mollusk or micromollusk in the family Scissurellidae, the little slit snails.

Description
The height of the shell reaches 2.1 mm.

Distribution
This marine species occurs off the Bahamas and Puerto Rico.

References

 Geiger D.L. (2012) Monograph of the little slit shells. Volume 1. Introduction, Scissurellidae. pp. 1-728. Volume 2. Anatomidae, Larocheidae, Depressizonidae, Sutilizonidae, Temnocinclidae. pp. 729–1291. Santa Barbara Museum of Natural History Monographs Number 7

External links
 To Encyclopedia of Life
 To World Register of Marine Species

Scissurellidae
Gastropods described in 1886